The Brumby Ministry was the 66th ministry of the Government of Victoria. It was led by the Premier of Victoria, John Brumby, and Deputy Premier, Rob Hulls. It succeeded the Bracks Ministry on 3 August 2007, following the retirement of former Premier Steve Bracks and his deputy John Thwaites. Brumby had been sworn as Premier three days earlier on 30 July; he had temporarily been sworn into Bracks' and Thwaites' portfolios until a reshuffle could be arranged.

The ministry underwent three reshuffles since 2007. The first occurred in December 2008, triggered by the resignation of Theo Theophanous: Martin Pakula was appointed to the resulting vacancy. The second reshuffle occurred on 20 January 2010 after Lynne Kosky's resignation. A new position of Minister for the Respect Agenda was created. Pakula took on Kosky's role as Minister for Public Transport, with Peter Bachelor given the Arts portfolio. Lily D'Ambrosio joined the Cabinet as Minister for Community Development. The third occurred when Bob Cameron resigned on 7 October 2010. James Merlino became Minister for Police and Minister for Corrections in his place, although Cameron retained the Emergency Services portfolio until the November state election in order to finalise key bushfire reforms.

Portfolios

References

External links
Members of Cabinet, Department of Premier and Cabinet (Government of Victoria)

Victoria (Australia) ministries
Australian Labor Party ministries in Victoria (Australia)
Ministries of Elizabeth II